The 1988 Women's European Cup was the first women's rugby European championship and the first multi-national women's rugby competition of any sort, albeit not an official FIRA competition.

It was also the only occasion where a Great Britain side entered such a competition. In all future women's rugby competitions Great Britain would be represented by the four individual nations.

Final table

Results

See also
 Women's international rugby
 1982 Netherlands v France women's rugby match (first women’s international rugby match)
 RugbyFest 1990 (first cross-continental women's rugby tournament)

References

External links
FIRA website

Women's rugby union competitions in Europe for national teams
1988 rugby union tournaments for national teams
International women's rugby union competitions hosted by France
Woman
Woman
Woman
European Cup
1988 in Dutch sport
1987–88 in European rugby union